This is a partial list of Korean novelists.

A

Ahn Jung-hyo 
Ahn Soo-kil

B
Bae Su-ah 
Baek Minseok
Bang Hyun-seok
Bang Young-ung 
Bok Koh-il

C 
Jeong Chan (author)
Cheon Myeong-kwan 
Cho Hae-il 
Choi In-ho 
Choi Il-nam
Choi In-hun
Choi Soo-cheol
Chae Man-shik 
Cho Se-hui 
Cho Seon-jak
Cho Sung-ki
Choe Yun
Chun Woon-young

G 
Gong Ji-young
Gong Sun-ok
Gu Hyo-seo

H
Ha Geun-chan
Ha Seong-nan
Hailji
Han Chang-hun
Han Kang
Hyun Kil-Un
Han Mahlsook
Han Moo-sook
Han Sorya
Han Su-san
Heo Gyun
Hong Sung-won
Hwang Suk-young
Hwang Sun-mi
Hwang Sun-won
Hyun Jin-geon

I
Im Chul-woo

J
Jang Eun-jin
Jang Jeong-il
Jeon Gyeong-rin
Jeon Sang-guk
Jeong Do-sang
Jo Jung-rae
Jo Kyung-ran
Jung Eun-gwol
Jung Ihyun
Jung Hansuk
Jung Mi-kyung
Jung Young-moon

K
Kang Kyeong-ae 
Kang Sok-Kyong
Kang Younghill 
Kang Young-sook 
Kim Ae-ran
Kim Byeol-ah
Kim Chae-won
Kim Chi-won 
Kim Dong-in 
Kim Dong-ni 
Kim Gu-yong
Kim Gyeong Uk
Kim Haki
Kim In-suk
Kim Jae-Young
Kim Jeong-hwan
Kim Ju-yeong
Kim Mi-wol
Kim Moon-soo (novelist)
Kim Myeong-sun 
Kim Ryeo-ryeong 
Kim Tak-hwan
Kim Yeon-su
Kim Yoo-jung
Kim Seong-dong
Kim Seung-ok
Kim Won-il 
Kim Wonu
Kim Yeong-hyeon 
Kim Yong-ik 
Kim Yong-man 
Kim Young-ha
Kwon Jeong Saeng
Kwon Yeo-sun

L
Lee Dong-ha 
Lee Ho-cheol
Lee Hyo-seok 
Lee In-hwa
Lee Jangwook 
Lee Ki-ho (author)
Lee Kyun-young 
Lee Mankyo
Lee Mun Ku
Lee Oyoung
Lee Seung-u
Lee Soon-won
Lee Yun-gi
Lee Ze-ha

N
Na Hye-sok
Nam Jung-hyun

O
Oh Jung-hee
Oh Sangwon
Oh Soo-yeon (author)
Oh Young-su

P
Paik Gahuim
Park Beom-shin
Park Chong-hwa
Park Hyoung-su
Park Kyung-ni 
Park Min-gyu 
Park Sang-ryung
Park Taesun
Park Taewon
Park Wan-suh
Park Yeonghan

S
Seo Hajin
Seo Jeong-in
Shin Kyung-sook
Sim Yunkyung
So Young-en
Son Bo-mi
Song Gisuk
Song Giwon
Song Sokze
Song Soo-Kwon
Song Yeong

Y
Yang Gui-ja 
Yi Chong-jun 
Yi Kwang-su 
Yi Kyoung-Ja
Yi In-Seong
Yi Mun-yol 
Yi Sang 
Yom Sang-seop 
Yoo Jae-yong 
Yu Haeon-jong
Yun Dae-nyeong
Yun Heung-gil

See also
List of Koreans
List of Korean-language poets
Korean literature

References

Novelists
 
Korean